Lake Alexander is a lake in Morrison County, Minnesota.

It was named for Thomas L. Alexander, an officer at Fort Ripley.

See also
List of lakes in Minnesota

References

Lakes of Minnesota
Lakes of Morrison County, Minnesota